Berga Naval Training Schools (BÖS) was a military branch school for the Swedish Fleet within the Swedish Navy, which operated in various forms from 1946 to 1997. The staff was located at Berga Naval Base in Haninge Garrison in Berga, Haninge Municipality.

History
After the industrialist Helge Axelsson Johnson died in 1941, the Berga estate was sold to the state for SEK 2,600,000 in 1944, and the navy then gained access to sought after land next to Hårsfjärden while the Swedish Forest Service (Domänverket) was taking over the agricultural land and Berga property. The area covered a beach strip stretching from Vitså harbor to Näringsberg and was 3.5 km long and 800 meters wide. In addition to the beach strip, a part of the area where the Berga Agricultural School was located was also added, with an area of 1,025 hectares. The purchase price for the acquisition of the property was SEK 2,635,000. The coastline was divided into a naval base and naval schools. The hunting ground was transformed into training area and firing range. The Berga Naval Training Schools started their operations in 1946, then as the Swedish Navy Non-Commissioned Officers’ School (Marinens underofficersskola, MUOS). Now the first wave of staff and families moved in. In Västerhaninge, a whole block was also built for the fleet's families.

The Berga Naval Training Schools' had the main task of training staff, both conscripts and professional officers, in seamanship and basic military training. At the schools there was also a certain vocational education. The Berga Naval Training Schools were formed by relocating the education at Skeppsholmen in Stockholm to Berga. On 1 July 1946, the operations at Berga Naval Training Schools began with training in the Non-commissioned School's chief mate and machinist programs (Underofficersskolans styrmans- och maskinistlinjer), while the craft, economy and coastal artillery programs began on 1 October. On 21 October 1946, the Crown Prince Gustaf Adolf initiated the opening of the Swedish Navy Non-Commissioned Officers’ School (Marinens underofficersskola, MUOS). In the summer of 1949, the construction of a facility for the exercise of the torpedo and submarine attack was started. From 1948 to 1949, submarine and anti-submarine warfare training began at Berga for both officers and conscripts. Parts of the training were transferred to the submarine training center Valrossen ("The Walrus"). In 1955, the Swedish Navy Non-Commissioned Officers’ School (Marinens underofficersskola, MUOS) was amalgamated into the Navy Schools at Berga (Marinens skolor på Berga) or Berga Schools (Bergaskolorna), a name that had existed since 1946 as a collective name of the schools at Berga. In 1960, the name of the school was changed to Berga Naval Training Schools.

Prior to the Defence Act of 1977, the Swedish Armed Forces Peace Organization Investigation (Försvarets fredsorganisationsutredning, FFU) considered that the naval training on land should be centralized and that Karlskrona Naval Training Schools (Karlskrona örlogsskolor, KÖS) and Berga Naval Training Schools should remain separate schools. This was something that was raised and also emphasized in the Government Bill 1978/79:96. There, the FFU considered that the navy's training organization was largely rational and felt that Karlskrona Naval Training Schools and Berga Naval Training Schools would remain as central educational institutions. In connection with the formation of the Swedish Armed Forces on 1 July 1994, the Berga Naval Training Schools changed name to the Berga Naval Training Schools, Swedish Armed Forces (Försvarsmakten Berga örlogsskolor, FM BÖS). Prior to stage two of the Defence Act of 1996, both the Swedish Armed Forces and the Swedish government proposed that Karlskrona Naval Training Schools be disbanded, and that its operations should amalgamated into in the Berga Naval Training Schools. However, the new school would continue to operate in Karlskrona. Thus, the Berga Naval Training Schools was also disbanded. On 1 July 1997, the new school, the Swedish Naval Training Schools (Örlogsskolorna, ÖS), was formed, with staff in Berga and training in both Berga and Karlskrona.

Operations
The Berga Naval Training Schools operated between 21 October 1946 to 30 June 1994. Under the commanding officer of the Berga Naval Training Schools, there was a staff with a chief of staff (SC), Planning and Economics Department (PEA), Central Department (CentA), Education Department (UtbA), Personnel Department (PersA), Administration Department (ForVA), Health Care Department (SjvA), Cadet and Candidate School Company (Kaskomp - later called staff company). The Berga Naval Training Schools received production support in the form of administration of wages from the East Coast Naval Base until 30 June 1990. During 1 July 1990 and 30 June 1994, the East Coast Naval Command managed the same task.

The Berga Naval Training Schools, Swedish Armed Forces (Försvarsmakten Berga örlogsskolor, FM BÖS) was organized as follows: under the commanding officer of the Berga Naval Training Schools, Swedish Armed Forces, there was a staff consisting of a staff company (later name change to Depot Company), Sports and Health Care Unit (IdrE), Education Department (UtbA), Personnel Department (PersA), Planning and Economics Office (PeD), and schools. The Berga Naval Training Schools, Swedish Armed Forces provided production support for the Coastal Fleet's units from 1 November 1994 in the form of administration of wage payments.

Units
In the years 1946-1997, the following schools have been included in the Berga Naval Training Schools.

Navy Non-Commissioned Officers’ School (Marinens underofficersskola, MUOS) 1946–1972
Weapons Officers’ School (Vapenofficersskola, VOS) 1950–1972, 1982–1987-06-30)
Navy Company Officers’ School (Marinens kompaniofficersskola, MKS) 1972–1982
Weapon Regimental Officers’ School (Vapenregementsofficersskola, VRS) 1972–1982
Navy Staff College (Marinens krigshögskola, MKHS) 1987-07-01–1996-12-31
Artillery and Torpedo School (Artilleri- och torpedskolan, ATskol) –1982-12-31
Surface Attack School (Ytattackskolan, YAskol; 1983-01-01–1995-12-31
Base and Recruit School (Bas- och rekrytskolan, BRskol) –1998-03-30
Basic Training Battalion (Grundutbildningsbatljonen, GU-bat) 1988-04-01–1997-06-30
Machine School (Maskinskolan, Maskol) –1982-12-31
Ship Technical School (Skeppstekniska skolan, STskol) 1983-01-01–1993-06-30
Mechanical and Electrical School (Maskin- och elektroskolan, MEskol) 1993-07-01–1997-06-30
Radar and Signal School (Radar- och signalskolan, RSskol) –1982-12-31
Telecommunications Combat School (Telestridsskolan, TSskol) 1983-01-01–1995-12-31
Rescue Service School (Räddningstjänstskolan, RTskol) 1993-07-01–1997-06-30
Combat Medical School (Stridssjukvårdsskolan, Sjvskol) –1982-12-31
Safety Service School (Skyddstjänstskolan, Skyskol)–1982-12-31
Submarine and ASW School (Ubåts- och ubåtsjaktskolan, Ubjskol/UJskol) –1982-12-31
Underwater Combat School (Undervattenstridskolan, USskol) 1983-01-01–1995-12-31
Navy Diving Center (Marinens dykericentrum, MDC) 1979-07-01–1985-06-30
Command and Control System (Ledningssystemsskolan, LSskol) 1996-01-01–1997-06-30
Submarine Combat School (Ubåtsstridsskolan, UBskol) 1996-01-01–1997-06-30
Mine Warfare School (Minkrigsskolan, Mkriskol) 1996-01-01–1997-06-30
Surface Combat School (Ytstridsskolan, YSskol) 1996-01-01–1997-06-30

Heraldry and traditions

Flag
The flag of the Berga Naval Training Schools was a double swallow-tailed Swedish flag. The flag were presented to the Berga Naval Training Schools in 1996. It was later taken over by the Swedish Naval Training Schools (Örlogsskolorna, ÖS).

Coat of arms
The coat of arms of the Berga Naval Training Schools 1955–1997. Blazon: "Per bend sinister azure an anchor cabled and a torch in saltire and or a cock-capercaillie, all counterchanged".

March
The Berga Naval Training Schools was given the march "Älvsnabben" (Broberg) in 1966. The march was handed over by the then Crown Prince Carl Gustaf after a long distance journey with  during the years 1965-1966. The march was established on 10 February 1976. On 30 June 1994, it was replaced by the march "Vår flotta" (Widner). The march was taken over by the Swedish Naval Training Schools (Örlogsskolorna, ÖS) in 1998, and was then used by the Swedish Naval Warfare Centre from 2005 to 2006.

Commanding officers

1946–1949 – Bror-Fredrik Thermänius
1949–1951 – Kjell Hasselgren
1951–1956 – Erik Friberg
1956–1958 – Stig Bergelin 
1959–1961 – Sven Hermelin
1961–1966 – Gustav Lindgren
1966–1968 – Nils-Erik Ödman
1968–1971 – Tryggve Norinder
1971–1973 – Alf Berggren
1973–1978 – Hans Petrelius
1978–1980 – Göte Blom
1980–1984 – Christer Söderhielm
1984–1987 – Cay Holmberg
1987–1989 – Tomas Lagerman
1989–1991 – Ulf Samuelsson
1991–1993 – Roderick Klintebo
1994–1996 – Anders Stävberg
1996–1997 – Göran Frisk

Names, designations and locations

Footnotes

References

Notes

Print

Web

Further reading

Defunct schools in Sweden
Military education and training in Sweden
Military units and formations established in 1946
Military units and formations disestablished in 1997
Educational institutions established in 1946
Educational institutions disestablished in 1997
1946 establishments in Sweden
1997 disestablishments in Sweden
Haninge Garrison